Tsurai (Dargwa: Цурагӏи) is a rural locality (a selo) in Tsizgarinsky Selsoviet, Dakhadayevsky District, Republic of Dagestan, Russia. The population was 189 as of 2010.

Geography 
Tsurai is located 15 km northeast of Urkarakh (the district's administrative centre) by road. Tsizgari and Kanasiragi are the nearest rural localities.

Ethnic groups 
Dargins live there.

References 

Rural localities in Dakhadayevsky District